The Private Enterprise Foundation (PEF) is the umbrella organization for all private Ghanaian businesses.

The Governing council
The Governing Council of the PEF is the highest decision making body of the Foundation. The council has representative of member associations and it is made up of the Ghana National Chamber of Commerce and Industry (GNCCI), Ghana Employers Association (GEA), Federations of Associations of Ghanaian Exporters (FAGE), Association of Ghana Industries (AGI), Ghana Association of Bankers (GAB) & Ghana Chamber of Mines (GCM).

Executive Members
The PEF is headed by Asare Akuffo.

References

Business organisations based in Ghana